The 2017–18 Loyola Greyhounds men's basketball team represented Loyola University Maryland during the 2017–18 NCAA Division I men's basketball season. The Greyhounds, led by fifth-year head coach G. G. Smith, played their home games at Reitz Arena in Baltimore, Maryland as members of the Patriot League. They finished the season 9–22, 6–12 in Patriot League play to finish in a tie for eighth place. They defeated Army in the first round of the Patriot League tournament before losing in the quarterfinals to Bucknell.

On March 8, 2018, the school announced G. G. Smith had resigned as head coach. He finished at Loyola with a five-year record of 56–98. On March 28, the Greyhounds hired Georgia Tech assistant coach Tavaras Hardy for the head coaching job.

Previous season
The Greyhounds finished the 2016–17 season 16–17, 8–10 in Patriot League play to finish in a tie for sixth place with Colgate. As the No. 7 seed in the  Patriot League tournament, they defeated Lafayette in the first round  before losing in the quarterfinals to Boston University. They received an invitation to the College Basketball Invitational where they defeated George Mason in the first round before losing in the quarterfinals to Coastal Carolina.

Roster

Schedule and results

|-
!colspan=9 style=| Exhibition

|-
!colspan=9 style=| Non-conference regular season

|-
!colspan=9 style=| Patriot League regular season

|-
!colspan=9 style=| Patriot League tournament

References

Loyola Greyhounds men's basketball seasons
Loyola